To Better Days may refer to:
 To Better Days (film), a 2012 Turkish drama film
 To Better Days (album), a 2020 album by Slaves